Balabac, officially the Municipality of Balabac,  is a 2nd class municipality in the province of Palawan, Philippines. According to the 2020 census, it has a population of 42,527 people.

The municipality consists of some 36 islands, including the eponymous Balabac Island. The islands are notable for their uncommon indigenous plant and animal species, such as the nocturnal Philippine mouse-deer (or Pilandok). The islands are also home to dugongs, saltwater crocodiles, sawfishes, and sea turtles. Due to its biodiversity, the terrestrial and marine ecosystems of the Balabac archipelago are currently being pushed by scholars to be included in the tentative list of the Philippines for a possible UNESCO World Heritage Site nomination in the future.

History
Balabac was converted from a municipal district to a full municipality in 1957. Before that, it was a barrio of neighboring Bataraza.

Cape Melville Lighthouse

The Cape Melville Lighthouse, located on the island of Balabac, is one of the Philippines oldest lighthouses built in 1892 during the Spanish era and a major landmark of the town.

Geography
Not considering the disputed Spratly Islands, the municipality is the westernmost point in the Philippines. It is separated from Sabah by the Balabac Strait.

Islands
The municipality of Balabac is composed of a group of 36 major and minor islands, notable of which are the following:

Major islands
 Balabac
 Bugsuk
 Bancalan
 Mantangule
 Pandanan
 Ramos

Minor islands
 Canabungan
 Candaraman
 Gabung
 Mansalangan (Byan)
 Secam
 Bowen
 Lumbucan
 South Mangsee
 North Mangsee
 Salingsingan

Shoals and Sandbars
The municipality of Balabac is composed of various islands located at the Balabac Strait. The strait is known for its shallow waters due to the presence of shoals and numerous sandbars. Balabac has the third and fourth longest sandbars in the Philippines. The third longest is Queen Helen Sandbar at the southern tip of Bugsuk and the fourth is the Angela Sandbar east of Mansalangan.

Barangays

Balabac is politically subdivided into 20 barangays:

 Agutayan
 Bugsuk (New Cagayancillo)
 Bancalaan
 Indalawan
 Catagupan
 Malaking Ilog
 Mangsee
 Melville
 Pandanan
 Pasig
 Rabor
 Ramos
 Salang
 Sebaring
 Poblacion I
 Poblacion II
 Poblacion III
 Poblacion IV
 Poblacion V
 Poblacion VI

Climate
Balabac has a tropical monsoon climate (Am) with moderate rainfall from February to May and heavy rainfall in the remaining months.

Demographics

Economy

Culture
The Molbog people dominate the municipality of Balabac, as well as the municipality of Bataraza in the north. The area is the homeland of the Molbog people since the classical era prior to Spanish colonization. The Molbog are known to have a strong connection with the natural world, especially with the sacred pilandok (Philippine mouse-deer), which can only be found in the Balabac islands. An indigenous folktale tells the story of a naughty Philippine mouse-deer that tricked a prince into giving up his bag of gold while facing a hive of angry bees. Another tale depicts him as a clever guardian of the environment, using his wisdom as an advantage against those who destroy forests, seas, and wildlife. The coconut is especially important in Molbog culture at it is their most prized agricultural crop.

Transportation
Balabac is a three-hour boat trip from Bataraza on the island of Palawan; Bataraza in turn can be reached from Palawan's capital city Puerto Princesa.

An old airstrip located on the island of Bugsuk serves no commercial flights. Another private airstrip is located on the island of Ramos.

Healthcare 

 Balabac District Hospital is situated in Barangay Catagupan

References

External links

Balabac Profile at PhilAtlas.com
[ Philippine Standard Geographic Code]
Philippine Census Information
Local Governance Performance Management System

Municipalities of Palawan
Island municipalities in the Philippines